

Medal table

Men's events

References

Events at the 1991 Pan American Games
1991 in taekwondo
Taekwondo at the Pan American Games